Burov is a rural locality (a khutor) in Mikhaylovka Urban Okrug, Volgograd Oblast, Russia. The population was 5 as of 2010.

Geography 
Burov is located 45 km southeast of Mikhaylovka. Cheremukhov is the nearest rural locality.

References 

Rural localities in Mikhaylovka urban okrug